The Saumspitze is a  mountain in the Verwall Alps, a mountain range of the Central Eastern Alps. It is situated in the West of the Austrian state of Tyrol.

The ascent on normal route from the alpine club hut Därmstädter Hütte at 2384 m to the summit takes approximately two hours and difficulty grade is I on UIAA climbing scale.

References 

Mountains of Tyrol (state)
Mountains of the Alps
Verwall Alps
Alpine three-thousanders